Fagali'i Airport  is a disused airport located in Fagali'i, Samoa. It has operated intermittently since 1970.

History 
In 1939 the New Zealand colonial administration decided to construct two  military airfields in Samoa, one each for land- and sea-planes. The land-based airfield was to be located on land from the Vailele plantation of the government-owned Reparation Estates near Fagali'i, and the site was surveyed. The plans were later abandoned, but in 1969 construction finally began. Flights to Pago Pago were operating by April 1970. Initially a grass-only airstrip, Fagali'i was paved and reopened on 6 July 2002 under the exclusive operation of Polynesian Airlines. It was shut down again in January 2005 due to Government and village concerns over safety and noise.

On 1 July 2009, Polynesian Airlines reopened Fagali'i airport and resumed a service that included international flights to Pago Pago, American Samoa. The reopening of the airport was controversial and attracted criticism both for the safety and environmental issues with the airport's configuration and for the potential burden on local communities should the scheme fail. In August 2014 Polynesian Airlines opened a new VIP lounge at the airport. In December 2014 it resumed flights from Fagali'i to Maota Airport in Savaiʻi.

Airlines that have operated from the airport include:
 Polynesian Airlines (now Samoa Airways) 
 Samoa Air
 South Pacific Island Airways
 Talofa Airways

In 2018 the Samoan Government decided that airport operations would be returned to the Samoa Airports Authority.

The airport closed for safety reasons on 31 December 2019 after failing to meet international standards.  All flights were transferred to Faleolo International Airport. It was handed over to the Ministry of Police for use as a vehicle inspection site and testing range. During the Covid-19 pandemic it was used as a covid testing site for law enforcement officers. 

In August 2022 Public Enterprises Minister Leatinuu Wayne So’oialo confirmed plans to reopen the airport for flights to American Samoa. In September 2022 the government confirmed plans to reopen Fagali'i , but also assigned a Minister to find an alternative site for an eventual replacement.

References 

Airports in Samoa